Karim Magomedovich Girayev (born 14 June 1997) is a Russian football player who plays for FC KAMAZ Naberezhnye Chelny.

Club career
He made his debut in the Russian Football National League for FC Akron Tolyatti on 27 February 2021 in a game against FC Veles Moscow.

References

External links
 
 Profile by Russian Football National League

1997 births
Footballers from Makhachkala
Living people
Russian footballers
Association football forwards
FC Anzhi Makhachkala players
FC Akron Tolyatti players
FC KAMAZ Naberezhnye Chelny players
Russian First League players
Russian Second League players